Josephat Obi Oguejiofor  is a Professor of Philosophy and Director of the School of General Studies, Nnamdi Azikiwe University, Awka, Nigeria. His areas of interest include African philosophy, medieval philosophy,  modern philosophy,  metaphysics,  analytic philosophy, philosophy of time, and philosophy and governance in Africa. He is an ordained Catholic priest.

Background 
Born in Nigeria, Oguejiofor graduated from Bigard Memorial Seminary with a First Class Honours in Philosophy. He studied at the University of London, and has a PhD in Philosophy from Catholic University of Louvain, Belgium. He started his lecturing career in 1987 at the Seat of Wisdom Major Seminary, Nigeria. Oguejiofor has been invited to lecture at the Catholic University of Louvain (1992–1994), and at the Institute of African Studies, University of Cologne, Germany (2001–2002). He was ordained a Catholic priest on August 15, 1986 at the Archdiocese of Onitsha, Nigeria.

Oguejiofor is a past president of the Nigerian Philosophical Association, the Catholic Theological Association of Nigeria, and the International Society for African Philosophy and Studies. He was the editor-in-chief of  UJAH: Unizik Journal of Arts and Humanities and OGIRISI: a New Journal of African Studies.

Works 
Oguejiofor has  written and co-written numerous books and journal articles. In 2001, he authored a book, The Philosophical Significance of Immortality in Thomas Aquinas. It was reviewed in The Review of Metaphysics by Leo J. Elders, who wrote, "Much research went into this clear and well-written book and the author shows a good acquaintance with the relevant literature."

Oguejiofor has written on the subject of democracy and governance. In one essay, "Democracy and Social Movements: In Search of the Democratic Ideal", he specified three characteristics necessary for democracy to remain feasible in a given society. He wrote that the society must have a system to change the government, that people must be able to vote and to pursue political goals in such a system, and that citizens must feel connected with that system.

References

External links 
 Nnamdi Azikiwe University - Faculty of Arts Staff page

 J. Obi Oguejiofor - Philpapers
 Josephat Obi Oguejiofor -  MHS School of Mission and Theology 
 

Nigerian philosophers
Living people
Political philosophers
Nigerian male writers
People from Anambra State
Academic staff of Nnamdi Azikiwe University
Year of birth missing (living people)